The Eglin Air Force Base Railroad was a 45-mile military railroad at Eglin Air Force Base in Florida. It was created in 1951, and was operational until the late 1970s.

History
Col. George P. Kendrick, chief of installations of the Air Proving command, announced on 11 August 1949, that negotiations were underway between the U.S. Air Force  and the chief of the U. S. engineers relative to salvaging railroad materials at Camp Claiborne and Camp Polk, Louisiana, the Playground News, Fort Walton, Florida, reported on 18 August 1949. Kendrick stated that Third Army headquarters had indicated that the 44th Engineers Construction battalion, now in training at Fort Bragg, North Carolina, would do the work on moving the railroad materials to the new location. Although no official date had been set, an unofficial report gave 15 November as an approximate arrival date for the engineer battalion.

It was constructed with materials salvaged from the Claiborne and Polk Railroad,  a  line between the two camps, abandoned in 1945. The line, nicknamed the "B & F" (for back and forth), began operation on 1 February 1952 as part of the transportation division, Air Proving Ground Command, and utilised two ALCO RSD-1 military diesel-electric locomotives for road work and one 80-ton General Electric centercab for switching the yard. Its first yard manager was Shelby White. In 1955, the locomotive mechanic was Roy Parker of the 3201 VRS Squadron.

Part of the main base track and spur to the ammunition dump was realigned in 1956 with the construction of the  runway 32/14 and the Strategic Air Command dispersal area.

Initial construction of a railroad line into the region had been discussed as early as 1927 as part of the Choctawhatchee and Northern Railroad, though military-use proposals didn't come forward until 1941. German POWs were used in clearing and grading the alignment during World War II. There was one commercial customer served by the line, a lumber pulp yard at Niceville which is now community athletic fields. The line was later abandoned in the late 1970s and the southern end, west of State Road 285, pulled up by the mid 1980s. Building 538, formerly the two-track, four-engine capacity engine house, serves as the vehicle maintenance corrosion control shop in 2009. Two of its four oversize doors have been walled closed. The (by then) four RSD-1 diesels were donated to the Tennessee Valley Railroad Museum. One book on Florida railroad history has reported that steam was operated on the neophyte base railroad, but no local accounts support this. Photos have surfaced that verify that a Baldwin Locomotive Works-built 2-8-0 locomotive named the "Eglin Queen" was used in the 1950s, but had been retired by December 1959 and stored on the wye at the L&N interchange.

Motive power

Steam
A Baldwin 2-8-0, named the Eglin Queen on her cabsides, but apparently unnumbered, was operated into the late 1950s, and was retired by December 1959. Some believe that it was formerly Lake Superior and Ishpeming Railroad number 32, but  this is chronologically impossible, as the LS&I #32 was operated on the Marquette & Huron Mountain tourist railroad in 1962 and was sold in 1967 to the Air Force. This leaves the Eglin Queen's exact heritage and identity known. Evidence exists that #32 was expended in a test of air-to-ground rockets on the Eglin range circa 1967, probably conducted on the rail spur into Aux. Fld 2, Pierce Field. An article carried by United Press International, dated 23 March 1967, describes the reactivated locomotive as outfitted with a "remote control guidance system" to serve as a target for planes "testing a new weapons system", and operating over 2.5 miles of track, controlled from a tower a mile from the rail line. A similar item dated 22 March 1967 carried by the Associated Press stated that the control system was designed by Leon Caver, task engineer for the project, and that the 60-year old, 180-ton locomotive had been reactivated to perfect railroad bombing techniques for North Vietnam. A third 2-8-0 steam locomotive, noted as wearing both Chesapeake & Ohio and Baltimore & Ohio lettering was also used for similar testing in 1964, as shown in a 1972 issue of Trains sporting heavy damage.

Diesel
A GE 80-ton B-B trucked switcher, number 1669, builder number 31376, built November 1952, formerly U.S. Army Transportation Corps 1669, at the Ogden, Utah arsenal, served at Eglin AFB, and later passed to Carswell AFB, Texas, by January 1979, and Fairchild AFB, Washington, thence to the U.S. Navy as 65-00639, at Bremerton, Washington, before being sold to American Silicon Technology, then to Silicon Metaltech.

One ALCO RSD-1 C-C trucked diesel locomotive that is documented to have been in use at Eglin AFB in 1955 was 8033, builder number 70654, order number S-1898 of 1942, delivered 1942, built for the U.S. Army Transportation Corps and operated on the Trans-Iranian Railway during World War II. No longer at Eglin by 1972, it went to Uruguay for the Uruguayan Railways (AFE) in 1977, where it was renumbered 601. It operated as a yard engine until about 1981 and was scrapped in 1988.

Four ALCO RSD-1 C-C trucked diesel locomotives were utilized at Eglin throughout the 1970s until the line was abandoned in 1978.
8014 - Builder number 70635, order number S-1898 of 1942, delivered November 1942, built for the U.S. Army Transportation Corps and operated on the Trans-Iranian Railway during World War II. Extant at the Tennessee Valley Railroad Museum.
8662 - Builder number 72155, order number S-1952 of 1944, delivered March 1945, built for use in Europe, returned to the U.S. in 1946. To the Tennessee Valley Railroad Museum. Parted out and scrapped by 1988.
8669 - Builder number 72162, order number S-1952 of 1944, delivered March 1945, built for use in Europe, returned to the U.S. in 1946. Extant at the Tennessee Valley Railroad Museum.
8677 - Builder number 72170, order number S-1952 of 1944, delivered March 1945, built for use in Europe, returned to the U.S. in 1946. Extant at the Tennessee Valley Railroad Museum.

Other equipment identified as operated at Eglin includes the following:
 Ohio Locomotive Crane Company Model EFA 25-Ton Capacity diesel crane, constructor number 4680, shipped 12 June 1952.

References

Florida railroads
Defunct Florida railroads
Military railways
Industrial railroads in the United States
Railway lines opened in 1951